The Canadian Virtual University (abbreviated bilingually as CVU-UVC) was a consortium of Canadian universities that specialized in online distance education. Founded in 2000 to promote online programs in post-secondary education, CVU-UVC was made up of public universities accredited by both their home provincial governments and Universities Canada that operated a central information resource about programs and course offerings and facilitated transfer credits from other member institutions. Member universities retained full institutional autonomy in terms of academic policies and regulations, including admissions, tuition and related fees, content and design of courses, assessment, transfer credit assignments, and appeals. CVU-UVC was governed by a board of directors, an advisory committee, and an executive director.  

The member institutions of CVU-UVC disbanded the consortium on 17 June 2019, citing the increased prevalence of online learning programs in Canada as evidence that CVU-UVC had accomplished its goal of promoting online distance education.

Member universities

References

External links

2000 establishments in Canada
2019 disestablishments in Canada
College and university associations and consortia in Canada
Distance education in Canada